Thomas More (1531–1606), of Hambleden, Buckinghamshire; Barnbrough, Yorkshire; Leyton, Essex and North Mimms, Hertfordshire, was an English politician.

He was a Member (MP) of the Parliament of England for Ripon in November 1554, during the reign of Mary I of England.

Family

More was the son of John More II (1510-1547), the only son of Sir Thomas More and his first wife Jane Colt (c.1488-1511). His paternal great-grandfather was lawyer and judge John More.

References

1531 births
1606 deaths
English MPs 1554–1555
People from Wycombe District
People from the Metropolitan Borough of Doncaster
People from Leyton
People from Welwyn Hatfield (district)